Tetragonicipitidae is a family of copepods belonging to the order Harpacticoida.

Genera

Genera:
 Adoginiceps Gómez & Morales-Serna, 2015
 Aigondiceps Fiers, 1995
 Anguloceps Fiers & Iliffe, 1999

References

Copepods